Konsiga is a commune in the Cercle of Yélimané in the Kayes Region of south-western Mali. The main village (chef-lieu) is Kersignané. In 2009 the commune had a population of 8,275.

References

External links
.

Communes of Kayes Region